"Good Lovin' Gone Bad" was a 1974 Top 40 song in both the United States and the UK for the English rock band, Bad Company. The song was written by the band's guitarist Mick Ralphs and appeared on the album, Straight Shooter.

Billboard described it as a "raucous, smashing assault" and praised the vocal performance and the guitar playing.  Cash Box called it a "solid, quality rocker." Record World said that Bad Company "[lets] loose with new bold 'n' basic boogie."

Classic Rock History critic Janey Roberts rated it as Bad Company's 6th best song, calling it "pure straight ahead rock and roll."  Classic Rock critic Malcolm Dome rated it as Bad Company's 5th best song, calling it "a powerful statement of good time intent."

Track listing

Chart positions

References

1974 songs
Bad Company songs
Songs written by Mick Ralphs
Swan Song Records singles
1975 singles